Arvin Gymnasium is a multi-purpose sport venue on the campus of United States Military Academy in West Point, New York. The building hosts two basketball courts, rock climbing wall, weight room, racquetball courts and boxing rooms. It is the home of the Wrestling Program of the Army.

External links
Arvin Gymnasium at goarmywestpoint.com

Army Black Knights team handball
Army Black Knights wrestling
College wrestling venues in the United States
Handball venues in the United States
Sports venues in New York (state)
Wrestling venues in New York (state)